Frank Anthony Grillo (born June 8, 1965) is an American actor and martial artist. He played Brock Rumlow / Crossbones in the Marvel Cinematic Universe films Captain America: The Winter Soldier (2014), Captain America: Civil War (2016), Avengers: Endgame (2019), and animated series What If...? (2021). He had his first leading role in the action-horror film The Purge: Anarchy (2014), portraying Sergeant Leo Barnes, a role he reprised in The Purge: Election Year (2016), and has also appeared in Warrior (2011), The Grey (2012), End of Watch (2012), Zero Dark Thirty (2012),  Wolf Warrior 2 and Wheelman (both 2017), and Boss Level (2021). Grillo's television work includes the lead role in Kingdom (2014–2017) and recurring roles in Battery Park (2000), For the People (2002–2003), The Shield (2002–2003), Prison Break (2005–2006), Blind Justice (2005), The Kill Point (2007) and Billions (2020).

Early life
Grillo was born in New York City to a working-class Italian-American family of Calabrian origin. He was raised in the Bronx and in Rockland County, New York. Grillo began wrestling at eight years old, and took up boxing at eighteen. In 1991, he started practicing Brazilian jiu-jitsu, in which he has studied under Rickson Gracie and holds a brown belt. Grillo graduated from New York University with a business degree and spent a year on Wall Street before being asked to do a Miller Genuine Draft beer commercial. On the podcast The Fighter and the Kid, he stated that he holds Italian citizenship.

Career

Film

Grillo started his acting career by appearing in commercials, for companies such as American Express and Sure deodorant. His first film role was in 1992's The Mambo Kings, and he went on to appear in the films Minority Report (2002), April's Shower (2006), and both iMurders and New Line Cinema's Pride and Glory in 2008.

Grillo was in the 2010 horror film Mother's Day in the role of Daniel Sohapi and the following year, had a supporting role in the 2011 film Warrior as MMA trainer Frank Campana. In 2012, he played Diaz in the survival thriller The Grey with Liam Neeson and as Sarge in End of Watch with Jake Gyllenhaal. In 2013, he starred with Jaimie Alexander in the romantic thriller film Collision and had a bit role in the action film Homefront with Jason Statham.

In 2014, Grillo was cast as HYDRA agent Brock Rumlow in the 2014 film Captain America: The Winter Soldier. The same year, he starred as Sergeant Leo Barnes in the sequel The Purge: Anarchy, and reprised his role in 2016's The Purge: Election Year. He also reprised the role of Brock Rumlow/Crossbones in the third installment of the Captain America film series, Civil War, which was released on May 6, 2016.

In October 2013, Grillo started filming for The Crash, starring alongside Academy Award nominee Minnie Driver, Ed Westwick, AnnaSophia Robb, Dianna Agron, John Leguizamo, Mary McCormack, Christopher McDonald and Maggie Q. The film is directed by Aram Rappaport and produced by Hilary Shor, Atit Shah and Aaron Becker. The Crash was released on January 31, 2017.

In 2015, Grillo starred in the films Demonic and Big Sky. Another film in which he stars, Beyond Skyline, was originally set for release in 2015, and was ultimately released on Netflix in December 2017.

In 2018, Grillo starred opposite Bruce Willis and Johnathon Schaech in the action film Reprisal. Years after its release, the film made it on Netflix's U.S. top five in October 2021.

In 2019, Variety announced that Grillo has signed with Creative Artists Agency (CAA) for representation.

Grillo produced and starred in Boss Level, which was announced in November 2017 and was originally scheduled to be released by Entertainment Studios Motion Pictures on August 16, 2019, but was delayed. It was subsequently bought by Hulu, which released it on March 5, 2021. He also appeared in the sequel Hitman's Wife's Bodyguard with Ryan Reynolds and Samuel L. Jackson.

More recently, he has appeared in the films This Is the Night with Naomi Watts, Copshop with Gerard Butler, Ida Red with Melissa Leo, The Yacht with Ruby Rose and A Day to Die with Bruce Willis.

Television

Grillo first appeared on television in episodes of Silk Stalkings (1993), and Poltergeist: The Legacy (1996) before being cast as oil tycoon Hart Jessup on the daytime soap opera Guiding Light in 1996 up until 1999. In 2002, he was cast in the series For the People as Det. J.C. Hunter and played Hunter until 2003. One of his more notable television roles was on the crime drama Prison Break where he played Nick Savrinn from 2005 to 2006. During that time, he also appeared on the Blind Justice as Marty Russo.

He was in the first and only season of The Kill Point in 2007, and played the role of Jimmy in the CSI: NY episode "The Things About Heroes," which aired in November 2007. In 2010, he starred in the sci-fi series The Gates opposite Marisol Nichols and Rhona Mitra. The series only lasted one season.

Between 2014 and 2017, Grillo starred in the DirecTV drama series Kingdom as MMA coach Alvey Kulina alongside Nick Jonas and Jonathan Tucker.

Grillo was a season 5 regular on the drama series Billions, starring as artist Nico Tanner opposite Damian Lewis and Maggie Siff. He also reprised the role of Crossbones by voicing the character on the Marvel Cinematic Universe animated series What If...

Personal life
He married his first wife Kathy in 1991, but the couple divorced in 1998. They had one son together, born in 1997. Grillo met fellow actress Wendy Moniz in 1996 on the set of Guiding Light. The couple were married on October 28, 2000, and divorced in 2020. They have two sons together, born in 2004 and 2008.

Grillo is a New York Yankees fan.

Filmography

Film

Television

References

External links

 
 

1965 births
American people of Italian descent
American male film actors
Male models from New York (state)
American male soap opera actors
American male television actors
American male voice actors
Living people
Male actors from New York City
New York University Stern School of Business alumni
American practitioners of Brazilian jiu-jitsu
People from the Bronx
People from Rockland County, New York
People of Calabrian descent